2009 Sagan Tosu season

Competitions

Player statistics

Other pages
 J. League official site

Sagan Tosu
Sagan Tosu seasons